Lenapenem is a carbapenem antibiotic.

References

External links
 Recent developments in carbapenems

Carbapenem antibiotics